Betty Parsley is a Canadian politician, who was elected to the Newfoundland and Labrador House of Assembly in the 2015 provincial election. She represented the electoral district of Harbour Main as a member of the Liberal Party from 2015 to 2019.

Prior to her election to the legislature, Parsley served as mayor of Harbour Main-Chapel's Cove-Lakeview. She lives in Holyrood.

Background 
Parsley was born and raised in Harbour Main and received formal training in travel and tourism. She had a career as a travel consultant before going into politics. Her first involvement in municipal politics was in 2007 when she was elected as a town councillor.

References

Living people
Liberal Party of Newfoundland and Labrador MHAs
Women MHAs in Newfoundland and Labrador
21st-century Canadian politicians
21st-century Canadian women politicians
Mayors of places in Newfoundland and Labrador
Women mayors of places in Newfoundland and Labrador
Year of birth missing (living people)